Rao Narendra Singh was the Minister of Health of the Indian state of Haryana. He lost Bhiwani-mahendragarh Parliamentary Constituency in 2009 elections, but won assembly election from Narnaul assembly seat in October 2009 on Haryana Janhit Congress Ticket. Later he joined congress and subsequently the chief minister included him in his cabinet.

Controversies 
Two employees of the Narnaul City Council were electrocuted while preparing a wedding site for Haryana Health Minister Rao Narender Singh's daughter. Rao Narendra Singh was accused of misusing position. Both men were from Valmiki and died at the wedding venue.

References

State cabinet ministers of Haryana
Living people
Haryana MLAs 2009–2014
Haryana Janhit Congress politicians
Indian National Congress politicians
Year of birth missing (living people)